The Yumu (also written Jumu) were an Indigenous Australian people of the Northern Territory.

Language
The Yumu language was called Ŋatatara. This was often mistaken for their ethnonym and transcribed Ngatatara leading to confusion between the Yumu and the Ngaatjatjarra of Western Australia.

Country
Their northern reaches were apparently just south of central Mount Wedge and Lake Bennett. He puts their southern limits around Mount Solitary and Mount Udor. They were also present at Haast Bluff (Ulambaura), which they called Paura, Mount Liebig and Peculiar.

Social organization
The marriage rules of the Yumu were, as with the Ngalia, found to be identical to that of the Arrernte class system with the difference that prefixes were attached to the respective sexes, t(j)a- for males, and na- for females.

Myths
According to Géza Róheim, like the Pintupi, the Yumu believed that menstruation was induced by a hirsute demon (mamu) called 'hair-big' (Inyutalu) is the cause of menstruation, which occurs when he penetrates the vagina, scratching it with his nails.

History of contact
According to Tindale, the majority of the Yumu people died as a consequence of an epidemic which swept their community between 1932 and 1940. A remnant of children were adopted into the Kukatja tribe thereafter. Their land was then claimed by the Ngalia as being  (unpossessed country). Both Margaret Heffernan and Sarah Holcombe, writing decades later, could find no evidence for their existence, while some early observers such as H. K. Fry considered them to be a branch of the Kukatja (Luritja).

Alternative names
 Jumu
 Ngadadjara
 Ngatatara. (Kukatja exonym.)
 Pa:kulja

Source:

Notes

Citations

Sources

Aboriginal peoples of the Northern Territory